The Syracuse Telephonic Exchange was founded after Frederick C. Brower introduced the Bell telephone to Syracuse, New York in 1878.

References

Defunct companies based in Syracuse, New York